The 2011 Fergana Valley earthquake affected Uzbekistan, Kyrgyzstan and Tajikistan at 01:35 local time on 20 July. The dip-slip shock had a moment magnitude of 6.1 and a maximum Mercalli intensity of VIII (Severe). Its epicenter was located just inside Kyrgyzstan's border in the Fergana Valley region. Fourteen were killed and eighty-six were injured.

Impact 
In Khujand, Tajikistan, one man was killed after panicking during the tremor and jumping out of a window. Fourteen people in Uzbekistan had been confirmed dead, while another 86 sustained injuries, of which 35 were hospitalized. Many houses in Fergana Region were damaged, with cracked walls. Numerous small houses in Margilan were destroyed. Many residents panicked and ran into the streets. A rockfall closed a highway between Batken and Osh. Apartment blocks in the city of Fergana were evacuated. At least 800 houses were damaged. Power was briefly knocked out in Kadamzhai, Tulgone, Kyzyl-Bulun, Halmion, Ohne, Yargutane, and Tamas. A hospital in Hamza, Uzbekistan was severely damaged.

See also
List of earthquakes in 2011
List of earthquakes in Kyrgyzstan
2008 Kyrgyzstan earthquake

References

External links

2011 earthquakes
2011 in Kyrgyzstan
2011 in Tajikistan
2011 in Uzbekistan
Earthquakes in Kyrgyzstan
Earthquakes in Tajikistan
Earthquakes in Uzbekistan
Fergana Region
July 2011 events in Asia
2011 disasters in Kyrgyzstan
2011 disasters in Tajikistan
2011 disasters in Uzbekistan
[